Yekaterina Parlyuk (10 January 1935 – 22 September 2004) was a Soviet middle-distance runner. She competed in the women's 800 metres at the 1960 Summer Olympics.

References

1935 births
2004 deaths
Athletes (track and field) at the 1960 Summer Olympics
Soviet female middle-distance runners
Olympic athletes of the Soviet Union
Place of birth missing